Olympiodorus the Elder was a 5th-century  Neoplatonist who taught in Alexandria, then part of the Byzantine (Eastern Roman) Empire.  He is most famous for being the teacher of the important Neoplatonist Proclus (412–485), whom Olympiodorus wanted his own daughter to marry. He is not to be confused with Olympiodorus the Deacon, an Alexandrian writer of Bible commentaries.

He lectured on Aristotle with considerable success. Owing to the rapidity of his utterance and the difficulty of the subjects on which he treated, he was understood by very few. When his lectures were concluded, Proclus used to repeat the topics treated of in them for the benefit of those pupils who were slower in catching the meaning of their master. Olympiodorus had the reputation for being an eloquent man and a profound thinker. Nothing of his has come down to us in a written form.

He is called "Olympiodorus the Elder" in contemporary references because there was a later (6th century) Neoplatonist philosopher also called Olympiodorus (Olympiodorus the Younger) who also taught in Alexandria.

Notes

References

5th-century philosophers
Roman-era Peripatetic philosophers
Roman-era philosophers in Alexandria

Late-Roman-era pagans